Multnomah County  is one of the 36 counties in the U.S. state of Oregon. As of the 2020 census, the county's population was 815,428. Multnomah County is part of the Portland–Vancouver–Hillsboro, OR–WA Metropolitan Statistical Area. Though smallest in area, Multnomah County is the state's most populous county. Its county seat, Portland, is the state's largest city.

History
The area of the lower Willamette River has been inhabited for thousands of years, including by the Multnomah band of Chinookan peoples long before European contact, as evidenced by the nearby Cathlapotle village, just downstream.

Multnomah County (the thirteenth in Oregon Territory) was created on December 22, 1854, formed out of two other Oregon counties – the eastern part of Washington County and the northern part of Clackamas County. Its creation was a result of a petition earlier that year by businessmen in Portland complaining of the inconvenient location of the Washington County seat in Hillsboro and of the share of Portland tax revenues leaving the city to support Washington County farmers. County commissioners met for the first time on January 17, 1855.

The county is named after the Chinookan word for the "lower river", Multnomah, Matlnomaq, máɬnumax̣ being interpretive English spellings of the same word. In Chinook Jargon, Ne-matlnomaq, means the "place of matlnomaq" or the (singular) Ne-matlnomag, "the lower river", from the Oregon City Falls toward the Columbia river. Alternatively, Chinookan máɬnumax̣ (also nímaɬnumax̣) ‘those toward water’ (or ‘toward the Columbia River’, known in Chinookan as ímaɬ or wímaɬ ‘the great water’).  The explorer William Clark wrote in his Journal: "I entered this river...called Multnomah...from a nation who reside on Wappato Island, a little below the enterence" (quoted from Willamette Landings by H.M. Corning).(see:Portland Basin Chinookan Villages in the early 1800s, Boyd and Zenk,) Although Clark refers to the Willamette River as Multnomah, he may not have understood the meaning.  Simply put, Multnomah ("down river" or "toward the great water") is the shortened form of nematlnomaq/nímaɬnumax̣".

In 1924, the county's three commissioners were indicted and recalled by voters "in response to 'gross irregularities' in the award of contracts for construction of the Burnside and Ross Island bridges"; since all three had been supported by the Ku Klux Klan, their recall also helped reduce that organization's influence in the city.

Vanport, built north of Portland in 1943 to house workers for Kaiser Shipyards, was destroyed by a flood five years later.

In 1968, the Oregon Legislative Assembly referred a bill, Ballot Measure 5, to voters that would amend the state constitution to allow for consolidated city-county governments when the population is over 300,000. The 1968 voters' pamphlet noted that Multnomah County would be the only county in Oregon affected by the measure and voters approved the referendum in the 1968 general election. Since the approval of Measure 5 in 1968, an initiative to merge the county with Portland  has been considered and placed on the county ballot several times.

Since 2000
In the 2000 presidential election, Multnomah played a decisive role in determining the winner of the state's electoral votes. Al Gore carried the county by more than 104,000 votes, enough to offset the nearly 100,000-vote advantage that George W. Bush had earned among Oregon's 35 other counties. The Democratic tilt was repeated in 2004, when John Kerry won by 181,000 votes, and in 2008 when Barack Obama won by 204,000 votes.

In February 2001, the Multnomah County Board of Commissioners unanimously accepted the recommendation of the Library Advisory Board and authorized the library to enter into a lawsuit to stop the Children's Internet Protection Act.  The US Supreme Court ultimately decided in 2003 that the law was constitutional in US v. ALA. However, the library chose to turn down $104,000 per year of federal funding under CIPA to be able to continue to offer unfiltered Internet access.

Faced with decreasing government revenues due to a recession in the local economy, voters approved a three-year local income tax (Measure 26-48)  on May 20, 2003 to prevent further cuts in schools, police protection, and social services. Multnomah County was one of the few local governments in Oregon to approve such a tax increase.

On March 2, 2004, Multnomah County Chair Diane Linn announced the county would begin granting licenses for same-sex marriages, pursuant to a legal opinion issued by its attorney deeming such marriages lawful under Oregon law. Her announcement was supported by three other commissioners (Serena Cruz, Lisa Naito, Maria Rojo de Steffey), but criticized by Lonnie Roberts, who represents the eastern part of Multnomah county and was left out of the decision. Within a few days, several groups joined to file a lawsuit to halt the county's action.

But after that, Linn and the three commissioners developed a public feud, with the latter becoming known as the "mean girls".  The county government has also faced significant budget issues, including not being able to open the Wapato Corrections Facility since it was built in 2003.

Geography

It is the smallest county in Oregon by area. It is located along the south side of the Columbia River.

The county includes a number of extinct volcanoes in the Boring Lava Field. The Oregon side of the Columbia River Gorge forms the eastern portion of the county's northern border.

Major highways

 (decommissioned)

Adjacent counties
Columbia County - northwest
Clark County, Washington - north
Skamania County, Washington - northeast
Hood River County - east
Clackamas County - south
Washington County - west

National protected areas
Columbia River Gorge National Scenic Area (part)
Mount Hood National Forest (part)

Demographics

Racial and ethnic composition since 1960

2000 census
As of the 2000 census, there were 660,486 people in the county, organized into 272,098 households and 152,102 families. The population density was 1,518 people per square mile (586/km2). There were 288,561 housing units at an average density of 663 per square mile (256/km2). The racial makeup of the county was 79.16% White, 5.70% Asian, 5.67% Black or African American, 1.03% Native American, 0.35% Pacific Islander, 4.03% from other races, and 4.07% from two or more races. 7.51% of the population were Hispanic or Latino of any race. 16.0% were of German, 9.0% English, 8.8% Irish, and 5.1% American ancestry. 83.5% spoke English, 6.3% Spanish, 1.7% Vietnamese and 1.3% Russian as their first language.

There were 272,098 households, out of which 26.5% had children under the age of 18 living with them, 40.9% were married couples living together, 10.8% had a female householder with no husband present, and 44.1% were non-families. 32.5% of all households were made up of individuals, and 8.6% had someone living alone who was 65 years of age or older. The average household size was 2.37 and the average family size was 3.03.

In the county, the population was spread out, with 22.30% under the age of 18, 10.30% from 18 to 24, 33.80% from 25 to 44, 22.50% from 45 to 64, and 11.10% who were 65 years of age or older. The median age was 35 years. For every 100 females, there were 98.00 males. For every 100 females age 18 and over, there were 96.10 males.

The median income for a household in the county was $41,278, and the median income for a family was $51,118. Males had a median income of $36,036 versus $29,337 for females. The per capita income for the county was $22,606. 12.70% of the population and 8.20% of families were below the poverty line. Out of the total population, 15.40% of those under the age of 18 and 9.80% of those 65 and older were living below the poverty line.

2010 census
As of the 2010 census, there were 735,334 people, 304,540 households, and 163,539 families residing in the county. The racial makeup of the county was 76.5% white, 6.5% Asian, 5.6% black or African American, 1.1% American Indian, 0.5% Pacific islander, 5.1% from other races, and 4.6% from two or more races. Those of Hispanic or Latino origin made up 10.9% of the population. In terms of ancestry, 19.4% were German, 12.2% were Irish, 11.4% were English, and 4.2% were American.

Of the 304,540 households, 27.0% had children under the age of 18 living with them, 38.6% were married couples living together, 10.7% had a female householder with no husband present, 46.3% were non-families, and 32.6% of all households were made up of individuals. The average household size was 2.35 and the average family size was 3.03. The median age was 35.7 years.

The median income for a household in the county was $49,618 and the median income for a family was $62,956. Males had a median income of $45,152 versus $38,211 for females. The per capita income for the county was $28,883. About 11.3% of families and 16.0% of the population were below the poverty line, including 21.1% of those under age 18 and 12.1% of those age 65 or over.

2020 census
As of the 2020 census, there were 815,428 people residing in the county.

Law and government

Multnomah County was a strongly Republican county for much of the first half of the 20th century. However, since 1964, it has been the strongest Democratic bastion in Oregon. The Democrats have failed to win a majority in the county only two times since then, in 1972 and 1980.

As Multnomah County is by far the most populous county in Oregon, Democratic majorities in the county are often enough to swing the results in statewide elections. In 2008, Democratic challenger Jeff Merkley unseated incumbent two-term Senator Gordon Smith even though Smith carried 28 of Oregon's 36 counties. However, Merkley carried Multnomah County by over 142,000 votes, enough to allow him to defeat Smith by 59,100 votes.

The county courthouse is located in downtown Portland. The Multnomah County Central Courthouse opened in 2020, replacing a century-old building nearby that was in need of seismic retrofitting.

Elected officials
 County Commission

County officials

 Appointed officials 
 Elections: Tim Scott
 Finance: Mark Campbell
 Surveyor: James Clayton

 State legislators 
Map of Multnomah County Senate-Representative District Maps

Economy
The principal industries of Multnomah County are manufacturing, transportation, wholesale and retail trade, and tourism. Since Oregon does not have a sales tax, it attracts shoppers from southwest Washington.

The Port of Portland, established in 1891 and combined with the City of Portland's Commission of Public Docks in 1971, ranks third in total waterborne commerce on the West Coast, and 31st in the nation for total tonnage according to the 2009 American Association of Port Authorities' Port Industries Statistics.  Portland is one of the five largest auto import ports in the nation and is the West Coast's leading exporter of grain and lumber.  The Port of Portland is also responsible for Portland International Airport (PDX) in the northeast section of Portland, the Troutdale Airport a few miles east of PDX in Multnomah County, the Hillsboro Airport to the west in Washington County, and Mulino State Airport to the south in Clackamas County.

Out of the 199 cities and counties located in the five West Coast states,
Multnomah County ranked 198th in private sector job creation from 1997 to 2009.

Tourism

The county is home to a number of Portland-area attractions and venues, including Oregon Museum of Science and Industry, Portland Art Museum, Memorial Coliseum, Oregon Convention Center, Moda Center, Providence Park, Washington Park, Oregon Zoo, International Rose Test Garden, Lan Su Chinese Garden, Portland Japanese Garden, Hoyt Arboretum and Pittock Mansion.

It is also home to the Historic Columbia River Highway, Multnomah Falls, and Oxbow Regional Park.

Communities

Cities

Fairview
Gresham
Lake Oswego (small portion)
Maywood Park
Milwaukie (small portion)
Portland (county seat)
Troutdale
Wood Village

 Census-designated places 

 Cedar Mill (part)

 Dunthorpe

 Orient

 West Haven-Sylvan (part)

Unincorporated communities

 Bonneville
 Bridal Veil
 Burlington
 Corbett
 Dodson
 Dunthorpe
 Holbrook
 Interlachen
 Latourell
 Orient
 Riverwood
 Springdale
 Warrendale

Former communities
Vanport

Education
School districts include:

 Beaverton School District 48J
 Centennial School District 28J
 Corbett School District 39
 David Douglas School District 40
 Gresham-Barlow School District 1J
 Hillsboro School District 1J
 Lake Oswego School District 7J
 Parkrose School District 3
 Portland School District 1J
 Rainier School District 13
 Reynolds School District 7
 Riverdale School District 51J
 Scappoose School District 1J

Portland Community College serves western portions of the county and Mt. Hood Community College serves eastern portions.

See also
  ''

References

External links

Multnomah County
Multnomah County History from the Oregon State Archives
Historical Map of Multnomah County, Oregon Library of Congress  Map Date: January 1889 (hires)  

 
1854 establishments in Oregon Territory
Populated places established in 1854
Oregon placenames of Native American origin
Columbia River Gorge
Portland metropolitan area counties